Hernani Azevedo Júnior (born 27 March 1994), simply known as Hernani, is a Brazilian professional footballer who plays as a midfielder for  club Reggina, on loan from Parma.

Club career

Early career in Brazil
Born in São Gonçalo do Sapucaí, Minas Gerais, Hernani graduated from Atlético Paranaense's youth setup. He made his senior debuts in 2013 Campeonato Paranaense.

On 22 August 2013, Hernani was loaned to Série B side Joinville until December. He made his professional debut on 3 September, coming on as a second half substitute in a 1–1 home draw against Ceará.

Hernani returned to Furacão in January 2014 and made his Série A debut on 10 September, replacing Marcos Guilherme in a 0–1 away loss against Grêmio. Four days later he was handed his first start, and scored the last goal of a 2–0 home win against Vitória.

Zenit
On 16 December 2016, Hernani signed a five-year contract with Russian Premier League side Zenit St. Petersburg.

Saint-Étienne (loan)
On 8 August 2017, he joined Saint-Étienne on loan until the end of the 2017–18 season.

Parma
On 12 July 2019, Hernani joined Parma on loan until the end of the 2019–20 season, with Parma holding an obligation to buy. At the same time he signed a contract with Parma until 30 June 2023.

Loans to Genoa and Reggina
On 7 August 2021, Hernani joined Genoa on loan with an obligation to buy. The obligation was not fulfilled and the rights reverted to Parma.

On 1 September 2022, Hernani moved to Reggina on loan.

Career statistics

Notes

Honours
Brazil U-17
South American Under-17 Football Championship: 2011

Zenit Saint Petersburg
Russian Premier League: 2018–19

References

External links
 Atlético Paranaense profile 
 

1994 births
Living people
Sportspeople from Minas Gerais
Brazilian footballers
Brazil youth international footballers
Association football midfielders
Campeonato Brasileiro Série A players
Campeonato Brasileiro Série B players
Russian Premier League players
Ligue 1 players
Serie A players
Club Athletico Paranaense players
Joinville Esporte Clube players
FC Zenit Saint Petersburg players
AS Saint-Étienne players
Parma Calcio 1913 players
Genoa C.F.C. players
Reggina 1914 players
Brazilian expatriate footballers
Expatriate footballers in Russia
Brazilian expatriate sportspeople in Russia
Expatriate footballers in France
Brazilian expatriate sportspeople in France
Expatriate footballers in Italy
Brazilian expatriate sportspeople in Italy